Sufi refers to practitioners of Sufism or to topics related to Sufism.

Sufi may also refer to:
 "Sufi" (song), the Turkish entry in the Eurovision Song Contest 1988, performed by MFÖ
 Naren Ray, a Bengali cartoonist commonly known as "Sufi"
 The Sufis, one of the best known books on Sufism by the writer Idries Shah
 Sufi, Iran (disambiguation), places in Iran

People with Sufi honorific 
 Sufi Abdul Hamid African-American religious and labor leader
 Sufi Abu Taleb Egyptian politician
 Sufi Amba Prasad Indian nationalist
 Sufi Iqbal Pakistani religious leader
 Sufia Kamal Bangladeshi writer and activist
 Sufi Muhammad founder of Tehreek-e-Nafaz-e-Shariat-e-Mohammadi (TNSM), a Pakistani militant organisation
 Sufi Shah Inayat Shaheed 17th-century revolutionary from Sindh

See also 
 
 
 Sufian (disambiguation)
 Sufism (disambiguation)